Fred Vincent Pontare (born 13 May 1980) is a Swedish songwriter, producer, and singer. He is also known by the mononym Vincent. He regularly collaborates with Salem Al Fakir as songwriting, producer, and duo Vargas & Lagola. Together, they have worked with many pre-eminent artists, including: Avicii, Axwell Ʌ Ingrosso, Madonna, Seinabo Sey and Lady Gaga. 
In addition to their songwriting and production work, they release alternative pop music as Vargas & Lagola.

In August 2017, they were featured artists on Avicii's "Friend of Mine" from EP Avīci (01) which they co-wrote.

Career
Vincent Pontare started his musical career a solo artist under the mononym Vincent releasing his debut single "Paradise" in 2006 and the albums Lucky Thirteen (2007) and Godspeed (2011). Other hits as Vincent included "Don't Hate on Me", "Miss Blue" and "Baby Hurricane". In 2008 Pontare won the STIM Platinum guitar prize. His career in writing songs for other artists began to gain momentum in 2012 when he co-wrote Swedish House Mafia’s "Save The World" and "Reload" performed by Sebastian Ingrosso & Tommy Trash.

Among the first co-writes with Salem Al Fakir are Avicii’s 2013 Billboard Hot 100 single "Hey Brother" and "Younger" by Seinabo Sey. On Katy Perry's 2013 album Prism he co-wrote and produced "Love Me" with Bloodshy, Magnus Lidehäll and Camela Leierth.

At the 2014 Swedish Grammy Awards Vincent Pontare, Salem Al Fakir and Magnus Lidehäll were awarded Composer of the Year after writing for Veronica Maggio’s album Handen i fickan fast jag bryr mig and the Petter album Början på allt, and work with artists like Galantis.  In 2014 he wrote numerous songs on Mapei’s album Hey Hey and Avicii’s "The Days" and "Divine Sorrow" (with Wyclef Jean).
Pontare followed up with another successful year in 2015 co-writing most songs on Seinabo Sey’s highly acclaimed debut album Pretend and songs for Madonna’s Rebel Heart album. He also collaborated on David Guetta's single "Bang My Head" with Sia and Fetty Wap.

Vargas & Lagola have co-written some of the biggest hits by Axwell Ʌ Ingrosso – "More Than You Know", "Sun Is Shining", "Dreamer" and more - taken from their 2017 album More Than You Know. The duo have also contributed to two songs on Swedish rock band Ghost's Billboard 200-charting and Grammy Award-nominated album Prequelle, including the album's second single "Dance Macabre" which topped Billboard's Mainstream Rock Chart.

In 2018, the same moment as Vargas & Lagola blazed onto the alternative pop scene with the hit single "Roads", they shared the no.1 spot as Sweden's most streamed songwriters for songs including Avicii – "Without You" (featuring Sandro Cavazza) and "Waiting For Love". 
After working closely with Avicii for several years, Al Fakir and Pontare played a key role in finishing up the 2019 posthumous Avicii album TIM and are featured artists on three of the album songs. On 5 December 2019, Vargas & Lagola performed at Avicii's Tribute Concert in Stockholm.

Vargas & Lagola's debut album The Butterfly Effect was released in January 2020.

Personal life
Vincent Pontare is the son of the renowned Swedish musician Roger Pontare (born Roger Johansson). Vincent has a brother called Viktor Pontare.

Vicent Pontare is married to Agnes, whom he has been dating since 2009.

Discography

As Vargas & Lagola

2020: The Butterfly Effect

As solo artist

Albums

Singles

Songwriting and production credits

Songwriting and production credits for local Swedish artists

Awards and nominations

References

External links
 

1980 births
Living people
Swedish pop singers
English-language singers from Sweden
21st-century Swedish male singers
Swedish male singer-songwriters
Interscope Records artists
Musicians from Stockholm
Singers from Stockholm
Swedish Sámi musicians